Manam, known locally as Manam Motu, is an  island located in the Bismarck Sea across the Stephan Strait from Yawar on the northeast coast of mainland Papua New Guinea's  Bogia District.  The island is 10 kilometers wide, and was created by the activity of the Manam Volcano, one of the country’s most active. It was evacuated in 2004 and its residents resettled elsewhere in Papua New Guinea, but many have begun to return  despite concerns of future volcanic activity. Manam is erupting again as of May 2022.

Geology

Manam is a basaltic-andesitic stratovolcano, and despite remarkably symmetrical lower flanks has four distinct valleys, locally known as "avalanche valleys" due to their ability to focus avalanches and particularly pyroclastic flows generated at the summit. These valleys represent the highest-risk areas during eruptions, and, when the island was inhabited, were typically the first areas to be evacuated during heightened activity. The earliest documented eruption of Manam was in 1616.

History
The first recorded sighting by Europeans of Manam Island was by the Spanish navigator Iñigo Órtiz de Retes on 5 August 1545 when on board of the carrack San Juan tried to return from Tidore to New Spain.

Eruptions and hazards

Thirteen local residents were killed during an eruption on 3 December 1996, when pyroclastic flows reached the village of Budua.

In November 2004, a major eruption forced the emergency evacuation of over 9,000 inhabitants of the island. The eruption began October 24 but was not seen as a major threat until the wind changed pushing ash and debris towards inhabited areas.  Five people died during the eruption.  On December 11, the threat was downgraded due to a reduction in activity. There have been significant problems at Bogia on the mainland where the evacuees resettled in camps at Mangem, Asarumba and Potsdam.

In March 2007 the government of Papua New Guinea made a large area of land available for permanent resettlement of displaced islanders at Andarum near Bogia.  Also in March 2007, three people were killed by mudslides on the northern part of the island.  As of 2014, at least 2000-3000 people have returned to the island despite continued government concerns for their safety.

On March 8, 2022, the volcano erupted, sending a column of ash 15 km into the atmosphere. The eruption was confirmed by the Volcanic Ash Advisory Center in Darwin, Australia.

Residents
Manam Islanders have their own language called Manam Pile (literally "Manam talk"), which is spoken on Manam and the nearby Boisa Islands. Manam islanders have a reputation in Papua New Guinea for musicianship and have produced several locally renowned musicians.

See also
 List of volcanoes in Papua New Guinea
 List of Ultras of Oceania

References

External links
 http://www.radioaustralia.net.au/news/stories/s1876049.htm

Islands of Papua New Guinea
Stratovolcanoes of Papua New Guinea
Active volcanoes
VEI-4 volcanoes
21st-century volcanic events
20th-century volcanic events
Volcanic eruptions in 2022
Holocene stratovolcanoes